An antipropulsive is a drug used in the treatment of diarrhea. It does not address the underlying cause (for example, infection or malabsorption), but it does decrease motility.

Examples include diphenoxylate, loperamide, and eluxadoline.

See also
 Propulsive

References

Antidiarrhoeals